Babylon Istanbul is a music venue located in Istanbul, Turkey. It was opened by Pozitif on April 23, 1999 with a concert by John Lurie & the Lounge Lizards
.
In 2010, Babylon launched its Lounge restaurant, which is located just a street behind the main venue. They started "happy hours", warm-ups and after parties hosted by various DJs, before and after the concerts in Babylon. In earlier hours before the concerts, the audience can have a sit in the restaurant and have a dinner.

Since then, the venue in Beyoğlu has hosted hundreds of bands and over 1,500 concerts. The venue can accommodate 450 standing or 350 tables & standing audience.

Babylon's past hosted acts include: Patti Smith & Band, Marianne Faithfull, Of Montreal, The National, Roy Ayers, Omara Portuondo, Jane Birkin, Gotan Project, Matthew Herbert, Balkan Beat Box, Michael Franti & Spearhead, Meshell Ndegeocello, İlhan Erşahin’s Wax Poetic featuring Norah Jones, Elbow, Stereolab, Mouse on Mars, Rachid Taha, Natacha Atlas, Mulatu Astatke, Seu Jorge & Almaz, Ed Harcourt, Wax Tailor, Bomba Estereo, Tindersticks, US3, Roberto Fonseca, Efterklang, Lou Rhodes, Hercules & Love Affair, Sophie Ellis Bextor, Manu Chao, Buzzcocks, Lee Scratch Perry.

Some of the artists who have performed at Babylon include:

• Rock / Indie: Patti Smith, Broken Social Scene, Marianne Faithfull, The National, Of Montreal, Fujiya & Miyagi, Caribou, Jens Lekman, Sebadoh, Zita Swoon, Art Brut, Elbow, Ed Harcourt (with Sean Parker), Stereolab, Cat Power, Brazzaville, Rubin Steiner, Chicks on Speed, Easy Star All Stars, Tunng, Piano Magic, Infadels, Art Brut, Zola Jesus, Fenech-Soler, Guillemots, Wild Beasts, The Maccabees, No Age, Milow, Athlete, Seether, Kill It Kid, Little Fish, Summer Camp, Erlend Oye, Errors, Shearwater, Woodkid, The Big Pink.

• Electronica: Acid Symphony Orchestra, Uffie&DJ Feadz, Amon Tobin, Mouse on Mars, Plaid, Scanner, Swayzak, Bent, Tortured Soul, Buscemi, Dani Scilliano, Metro Area, Freaks, Pantha du Prince, FM Belfast; Four Tet, Rubin Steiner, Annie, Lali Puna, Au Revoir Simone, The Field, Telefon Tel Aviv, Alterego, Mike Paradinas, Luke Vibert, Luomo, Console, Merzbow, To Rocoto Rot, Chicks on Speed Curry & Coco, Ikonika, Gold Panda, Chinawoman, Rustie, Death in Vegas, Martyn.

• DJs: Afrika Bambaata, Grandmaster Flash, Kruder & Dorfmeister, Gilles Peterson, Mark Farina, Hot Chip, Tiefschwarz, Joakim, Alter Ego, Kraak & Smaak, DJ Mehdi, Gus Gus, Ian Pooley, Kid Loco, DJ Patilife, Asia Argento; Goldie, Andrew Wheatherall, Modeselektor, Mehdi, Peaches, Joakim, Yoda, Pilooski, Birdy Nam Nam, Coldcut, Rainer Truby Mousse T., Justus Köhncke, Apparat Band, Dominik Eulberg, The Gaslamp Killer; Kode 9.

• Jazz: Mike Stern, Courtney Pine, Jane Birkin, Nguyen Le, Alice Russell, Roy Ayers, Gwyneth Herbert, Ray Anderson, Bill Frisell, Jimmy Scott, Stacey Kent, Soullive, Marc Ribot, Ron Carter, Terri Callier, Nils Peter Molvaer, Courtney Pine, Nigel Kennedy, The Bad Plus, Five Corners Quintet, The Ray Gelato Giants, Club des Belugas, Carmen Souza, Andreya Triana, Ben L’Oncle Soul.

• Nu Jazz & Jazz Dance: Bonobo, Nostalgia 77, Gotan Project, Matthew Herbert, Belleruche, Five Corners Quintet, Erik Truffaz, Jimi Tenor, Groove Collective, Nojazz, De Phazz, The Spooks, De Lata, Brooklyn Funk Essentials, Ursula Rucker, Nouvelle Vague, Jose James, Guru’s Jazzmatazz, Incognito, Hypnotic Brass Ensemble, Little Dragon, Alice Russell, Wax Poetic, Bugge Wesseltoft, Koop.

• Latin/Brazilian: Omara Portuondo, Poncho Sanchez, Daniel Melingo, Eddie Palmieri, Omar Sosa, Orishas, Azymuth, Los de Abajo, Gotan Project, Natacha Atlas, Balkan Beat Box, Rachid Taha, Horace Andy, Oi Va Voi, Shantel, Talvin Singh, Esma Redzepova.

Music venues in Istanbul